Rao Sikandar Iqbal ,  c. 1943 – 29 September 2010) was the Defence Minister of Pakistan from 2002 to 2007.

Biography
Born in 1943, Iqbal took his primary education in Quetta, after which he joined the Forman Christian College in Lahore. He held an LL.B. from Punjab University Law College, and he was the secretary general of the students' union of the university .

In 1969, Iqbal joined the provincial revenue department as a tehsildar. In 1975, after meeting with president Zulfikar Ali Bhutto, he resigned and joined the Pakistan Peoples Party (PPP).

In 1988 Iqbal was elected to the National Assembly of Pakistan, and served as Minister of Food, Agriculture and Cooperatives under Benazir Bhutto, on her first term. He lost the elections in 1990, but was re-elected again in 1993 and served as Minister of Sports, Culture and Tourism, on Bhutto's second term, that ended in 1996. He also served as chairman of the National Assembly's Standing Committee on Defence.

Between 1997 and 2001 he was the chief of the Punjab PPP.

In 2002 Iqbal was elected to the National Assembly again and joined the group PPP-Patriots. He was inducted to the Federal Cabinet and served as Defence Minister during this time, he was also honoured as Deputy Prime Minister between 2002 and 2007 under Prime Ministers Mir Zafarullah Khan Jamali, Chaudhry Shujaat Hussain and Shaukat Aziz.

Personal life
Iqbal was married and had four children, a daughter, three sons  (Rao Atif N. Sikandar, Rao Faisal Sikandar and Rao Hasan Sikandar)and a grand son (Rao hassaan). His youngest son Rao Hasan Sikander is going to continue the legacy of his father by contesting in the next elections for the coveted seat of MNA from Okara.

Iqbal died after prolonged illness in Okara, on 29 September 2010, at the age of 68. He had been suffering from diabetes. Later, he suffered renal failure and needed dialysis.

Services 

Okara is known as City of Ministers.
It is also called a Milk Lake of Pakistan. 
Okara is beautiful gorgeous city which is often called Mini Lahore by tourists.
During the period of British rule there was a jungle of Okaan where the city has been built, and from this the name of the city was derived.

Following are some examples from the Services given by Rao Sikandar to Okara:-

 Rao Sikandar Iqbal Road, Okara.
 Benazir Road, Okara.
 Okara Bypass, Okara.
 Cadet College, Okara.
 Kulsoom Hospital, Okara.(Currently working as Social Security Hospital)
 University of Education, Okara.(Now moved to Renala Khurd)

References

1943 births
2010 deaths
Defence Ministers of Pakistan
People from Quetta
Pakistan People's Party politicians
Punjabi people
All Pakistan Muslim League politicians
Forman Christian College alumni
Punjab University Law College alumni
Pakistani people of Haryanvi descent